Barry Shuttleworth (born 9 July 1977) is an English former footballer who played in the Football League for Blackpool and Macclesfield Town.

External links
 

English footballers
English Football League players
1977 births
Living people
Bury F.C. players
Rotherham United F.C. players
Blackpool F.C. players
Scarborough F.C. players
Macclesfield Town F.C. players
Accrington Stanley F.C. players
People from Accrington
Association football defenders